Mirocossus is a genus of moths in the family Cossidae, described by J.W. Schoorl in 1990.

Species
 Mirocossus badiala (D. S. Fletcher, 1968)
 Mirocossus haritonovi Yakovlev, 2011
 Mirocossus kibwezi Yakovlev, 2011
 Mirocossus mordkovitchi Yakovlev, 2011
 Mirocossus politzari Yakovlev, 2011
 Mirocossus sinevi Yakovlev, 2011
 Mirocossus siniaevi Yakovlev, 2011
 Mirocossus sombo Yakovlev, 2011
 Mirocossus sudanicus Yakovlev, 2011

References

 , 1990: A Phylogenetic study on Cossidae (Lepidoptera: Ditrysia) based on external adult morphology. Zoologische Verhandelingen 263: 1–295. Full article: .
 , 2011: Catalogue of the Family Cossidae of the Old World. Neue Entomologische Nachrichten, 66: 1–129.
 , 2013: The Cossidae (Lepidoptera) of Malawi with descriptions of two new species. Zootaxa, 3709 (4): 371–393. Abstract:

External links

Cossinae